Amin Khan Aitigin was the Governor of Oudh and Lakhnauti (Bengal) under the Mamluk dynasty of Delhi in 1272. He was deposed the same year he took office.

Biography
Following the death of Governor Sher Khan in 1272, Amin Khan was appointed as the Governor of Oudh and Bengal by Ghiyas ud din Balban, the ruler of the Delhi Sultanate. Since most of Bengal had been under the control of the Eastern Ganga dynasty for over 30 years, he remained a weak governor with little money or power. This led to Tughral Tughan Khan, a former Governor of Bengal, being appointed by Balban as the deputy governor of Bengal.

Soon after, Tughral deposed Amin on the banks of the Ghaghara and declared himself the new Governor. Thus Amin Khan's short lived governorship ended in the same year he took office.

See also
List of rulers of Bengal
History of Bengal
History of Bangladesh
History of India

References

Mamluks
13th-century Indian Muslims
13th-century Indian monarchs
Turkic rulers
Governors of Bengal